MacPaint is a raster graphics editor developed by Apple Computer and released with the original Macintosh personal computer on January 24, 1984. It was sold separately for US$195 with its word processing counterpart, MacWrite. MacPaint was notable because it could generate graphics that could be used by other applications.  Using the mouse, and the clipboard and QuickDraw picture language, pictures could be cut from MacPaint and pasted into MacWrite documents.

The original MacPaint was developed by Bill Atkinson, a member of Apple's original Macintosh development team. Early development versions of MacPaint were called MacSketch, still retaining part of the name of its roots, LisaSketch. It was later developed by Claris, the software subsidiary of Apple which was formed in 1987. The last version of MacPaint was version 2.0, released in 1988. It was discontinued by Claris in 1998 because of diminishing sales.

Development 
MacPaint was written by Bill Atkinson, a member of Apple's original Macintosh development team. The original MacPaint consisted of 5,804 lines of Pascal computer code, augmented by another 2,738 lines of 68000 assembly language. MacPaint's user interface was designed by Susan Kare, also a member of the Macintosh team. Kare also beta-tested MacPaint before release.

MacPaint allow users to edit a 576-by-720 pixel, 72dpi bitmap (slightly wider than the screen, and slightly more than twice as tall as the screen). A occupies most of the screen real estate, offering a viewport into a portion of the bitmap, with toolbars and pattern palettes around it.

MacPaint uses two offscreen memory buffers to avoid flicker when dragging shapes or images across the screen. One of these buffers contained the existing pixels of a document, and the other contained the pixels of its previous state. The second buffer was used as the basis of the software's undo feature. In April 1983, the software's name was changed from MacSketch to MacPaint. The original MacPaint was programmed as a single-document interface. The palette positions and sizes were unalterable, as was the document window. This differed from other Macintosh software at the time, which allowed users to move windows and resize them.

The original MacPaint did incorporate a double zoom function. Instead of a zoom function, a special magnification mode called FatBits was used. FatBits showed each pixel as a clickable rectangle with a white border. The FatBits editing mode set the standard for many future editors. MacPaint included a "Goodies" menu which included the FatBits tool. This menu had been named the "Aids" menu in prerelease versions, but was renamed "Goodies" as public awareness of the AIDS epidemic grew in the summer of 1983.

Release and version history 
MacPaint was first advertised in an 18-page brochure in December 1983, following the earlier announcement of the Macintosh 128K. The Macintosh was released on January 24, 1984, with two applications, MacPaint and MacWrite. For a special post-election edition of Newsweek in November 1984, Apple spent more than US$2.5 million to buy all 39 of the advertising pages in the issue. The Newsweek advertisement included many pages dedicated to explaining how MacWrite and MacPaint worked together. After launch, a New York Times reviewer noted how MacPaint unfolded numerous graphic possibilities for the personal computer; he went further to say  "it is better than anything else of its kind offered on personal computers by a factor of 10."

MacPaint 2.0 was released on January 11, 1988, by Claris. It added many improvements to the software, including the capability to open and use up to nine documents simultaneously. The original MacPaint operated as a single-document application with an immovable window. MacPaint 2.0 eliminated this limitation, introducing a fully functioning document window, which could be sized up to 8 x 10". Several other features were introduced, such as a Zoom tool, MagicEraser tool for undo actions and stationary documents. MacPaint 2.0 was developed by David Ramsey, a developer at Claris. MacPaint 2.0 was sold for US$125, with a US$25 upgrade available for existing users of MacPaint. Claris discontinued technical support for the original MacPaint in 1989. Claris stopped selling MacPaint in early 1998 because of diminishing sales. There has been an unofficial update called MacPaint X which is 3.0 beta, mainly for people who wished to be able to use the program.

Since 2010, MacPaint 1.3's source code (written in a combination of Assembly and Pascal) has been available through the Computer History Museum, along with the QuickDraw source code, a library to draw bitmapped graphics, due to the support of Steve Jobs.

MacPaint inspired other companies to release similar products for other platforms; within a year a half-dozen clones existed for the Apple II and IBM PC. Some of these included Broderbund's Dazzle Draw for the Apple II, Mouse Systems' PCPaint for the PC, and IBM's Color Paint for the IBM PCjr.

Version history

References

External links 
 MacPaint Evolution from folklore.org
 Source code of MacPaint in the Computer History Museum
 Macpaint.org, a historical collection of Macpaint images
 HTML5 remake of MacPaint

Raster graphics editors
Classic Mac OS software
Classic Mac OS-only software made by Apple Inc.
Assembly language software
Discontinued software
1984 software
Proprietary software